John Walker (24 August 1873 – 17 February 1937) was a Scottish footballer who played for Armadale, Heart of Midlothian, Liverpool, Rangers and Morton in the 1890s and 1900s. He won national titles in Scotland and England, and represented both Scotland and the Scottish League XI.

Playing career

Club
Born in Shotts, North Lanarkshire, Walker played for local team Armadale before being recruited by leading club Hearts, making his league debut for the Edinburgh club on 18 February 1893. He played four full seasons with Hearts, winning two League Championships and one Scottish Cup, and was nearing the end of a fifth campaign when he was signed for Liverpool by manager Tom Watson along with teammate Tommy Robertson for £350 on 30 March 1898. He made his Reds debut in a Football League Division One fixture on 11 April 1898.

Walker only missed two games during his first full season, scoring 12 goals in 38 games, a decent return for an inside forward. He was a regular member of the Anfield club's first league championship win in 1901, and scored the winning goal against West Bromwich Albion on the final day of the season to secure the title.

Walker played another 18 times for Liverpool in 1901–02 before returning to Scotland to join Rangers, who had just won a fourth successive domestic title but were also facing financial troubles due to the reconstruction work required on their stadium after the recent 1902 Ibrox disaster. He scored at a rate of nearly a goal every two league games over his three seasons with the Glasgow club, and appeared in two further Scottish Cup finals. In 1905 he moved on to play for Morton, however he was there for only a short time before suffering a serious knee injury which ended his playing career.

International
Walker played five times for Scotland. He made his debut in an 1895 British Home Championship match against Ireland, scoring two goals in the 3–1 victory at Celtic Park. He also represented the Scottish League XI five times, while he was with Hearts and Rangers.

Later life and death
In 1910, Walker moved to Canada to become an engineer with Manitoba Telephones. He eventually enlisted for service in World War I (although was initially rejected due to his injured leg), joining the Canadian Military Engineers in 1916 and spending most of the conflict attached to the Canadian Signal Corps. After the war he returned to his telecoms job in Manitoba. He died in 1937 from an accident while cutting wood.

Honours
Heart of Midlothian
Scottish Football League: 1894–95, 1896–97
Scottish Cup: 1895–96

Liverpool
Football League Championship: 1900–01

Rangers
Scottish Cup: 1902–03
Runners-up: 1903–04

References

External links
Profile at LFCHistory.net
Hearts player profile at London Hearts

1873 births
1937 deaths
Military personnel from Lanarkshire
Royal Canadian Engineers soldiers
Royal Canadian Corps of Signals soldiers
Canadian Expeditionary Force soldiers
Scottish footballers
Sportspeople from Shotts
People from Armadale, West Lothian
Footballers from West Lothian
Heart of Midlothian F.C. players
Liverpool F.C. players
Rangers F.C. players
Greenock Morton F.C. players
Scotland international footballers
Scottish Football League players
Scottish Football League representative players
Armadale F.C. players
Association football inside forwards
Scottish emigrants to Canada
Canadian military personnel of World War I
Accidental deaths in Manitoba
Footballers from North Lanarkshire